Talipady  is a village in the southern state of Karnataka, India. It is located in the Mangalore taluk of Dakshina Kannada district in Karnataka.

Demographics
As of 2001 India census, Talipady had a population of 6498 with 2927 males and 3571 females.

See also
 Dakshina Kannada
 Districts of Karnataka

References

External links
 http://dk.nic.in/

Villages in Dakshina Kannada district